The 2019 World Aesthetic Group Gymnastics Championships, the 20th edition of the Aesthetic group gymnastics competition, was held in Cartagena, Spain from May 17 to 19, at the Sport palace of Cartagena.

Participating nations

Medal winners

Results

Senior

The top 12 teams (2 per country) and the host country in Preliminaries qualify to the Finals.

Medal table

References

External links

Official page
IFAGG Event site

World Aesthetic Gymnastics Championships
2019 in Spanish sport
2019 in gymnastics
Gymnastics competitions in Spain
International sports competitions hosted by Spain
World Aesthetic Gymnastics